Brandywine Creek is a stream in the U.S. state of Michigan. It is a tributary to the St. Joseph River.

The stream takes its name from the Brandywine Creek which flows through Delaware and Pennsylvania.

References

Rivers of Berrien County, Michigan
Rivers of Cass County, Michigan
Rivers of Michigan